The 1986–87 Czechoslovak Extraliga season was the 44th season of the Czechoslovak Extraliga, the top level of ice hockey in Czechoslovakia. 12 teams participated in the league, and Tesla Pardubice won the championship.

Regular season

Playoffs
Quarterfinal
 Pardubice – Gottwaldov 2:0 (6:2,4:2)
 Sparta Prag – Bratislava 2:0 (7:1,3:2)
 Jihlava – České Budějovice 2:0 (9:3,1:0)
 Košice – Brno 2:1 (8:1,2:3 PP,4:0)

Semifinal
 Pardubice – Košice 2:0 (7:1,6:4)
 Sparta Prag – Jihlava 0:2 (3:4,2:4)

Final
 Tesla Pardubice – Jihlava 3:2 (6:1,1:6,1:0,2:3,3:2 OT)

Placing round – 5th–8th place
 Brno – Gottwaldov 0:2 (3:7,3:4)
 České Budějovice – Bratislava 1:2 (4:5,5:4,2:3)

7th place
 Brno – České Budějovice 2:1 (3:1,3:7,6:3)
5th place
 Bratislava – Gottwaldov 2:1 (4:1,3:9,7:4)
3rd place
 Sparta Prag- Košice 2:0 (4:2,5:1)

Relegation round

1. Liga-Qualification 

 Poldi SONP Kladno – Plastika Nitra  3:0 (5:3, 4:1, 8:3)

External links
History of Czechoslovak ice hockey

Czechoslovak Extraliga seasons
Czechoslovak
1986–87 in Czechoslovak ice hockey